Wizorb is a video game created and published by Tribute Games. It was released on the Xbox 360 Xbox Live Marketplace on September 29, 2011. The gameplay is a cross between a Breakout clone and a role-playing video game. Wizorb was ported to Microsoft Windows, Mac OS X, and Linux. It was released for Windows through Steam on March 14, 2012, with added achievements and cloud storage. Upon release, Wizorb saw favorable reviews from critics, with VentureBeats Jacob Siegal listing it as one of the top 10 independent video games of 2011.

Gameplay
Wizorb is a cross between Breakout and a role-playing game. The core of the game takes place in a Breakout clone where the player can use magic to control the ball and help destroy the bricks and enemies. The RPG elements concern rebuilding a town, restoring its citizens and leadership, and fighting mini-bosses and bosses within the primary block-breaking gameplay.

Development
Wizorb was developed by Tribute Games and first released for the Xbox 360 through the Xbox Live Marketplace's Xbox Live Indie Games section on September 29, 2011. The game is the first title by the independent developer Tribute Games. Destructoids Jordan Devore noted that high quality Xbox 360 indie games are often ported to the PC, praising, "Wizorb is one such game". A port for Microsoft Windows was released on November 7, 2011, through the digital distribution website GamersGate. The computer version can be controlled by a gamepad, keyboard, or mouse. The entire game can be played using only a mouse, and the developer recommends this method as it "makes Wizorb rely even more on reflexes which feels great and makes the game a tad easier."

Even before the Windows release, the developers were working on porting the game to Mac OS X and Linux. On October 29, 2011, the developers stated they were considering porting the game to a smartphone platform, to which GameSetWatchs Eric Caoili exclaimed, "This thing needs to be on every device ever!" Using the MonoGame programming library, ports were released for OS X and Linux. The Windows version was made available through the Steam digital distribution platform on March 14, 2012. The game was later released for the Nintendo Switch on October 6, 2022.

Reception

The game received "favorable" reviews on all platforms according to the review aggregation website Metacritic.

The Xbox 360 and PC versions were rated as one of the top 10 independent video games of 2011 by VentureBeats Jacob Siegal.

Legacy
Cyrus was supposed to appear as a playable cameo character in the then-upcoming Wii U and PC game Hex Heroes, before the Wii U version was canceled, and there is no indication that the game will ever be completed.

References

External links
Official website

2011 video games
Breakout clones
Indie video games
IOS games
Linux games
MacOS games
Microsoft XNA games
Nintendo Switch games
Ouya games
PlayStation Network games
PlayStation Portable games
PlayStation Vita games
Tribute Games games
Video games developed in Canada
Windows games
Xbox 360 games
Xbox 360 Live Indie games